The Aquarian Gospel of Jesus the Christ (full title: The Aquarian Gospel of Jesus the Christ: The Philosophic and Practical Basis of the Religion of the Aquarian Age of the World and of the Church Universal) is a book by Levi H. Dowling. It was first published on 1 December 1908. Dowling said he had transcribed the text of the book from the akashic records, a purported compendium of mystical knowledge supposedly encoded in a non-physical plane of existence. In the later 20th century, it was adopted by New Age spiritual groups.
 
The title is derived from the practice in astrology of naming time periods in terms of constellations and their dominant positions in the sky, according to the earth's axial precession.  In that system, the Age of Aquarius is approaching.

Composition
 SECTION I (Aleph): Birth and Early Life of Mary, Mother of Jesus
 SECTION II (Beth): Birth and Infancy of John, the Harbinger, and of Jesus
 SECTION III (Gimel): Education of Mary and Elizabeth in Zoan
 SECTION IV (Daleth): Childhood and Early Education of John the Harbinger
 SECTION V (He): Childhood and Early Education of Jesus
 SECTION VI (Vau): Life and Works of Jesus in India
 SECTION VII (Zain): Life and Works of Jesus in Tibet and Western India
 SECTION VIII (Cheth): Life and Works of Jesus in Persia
 SECTION IX (Teth): Life and Works of Jesus in Assyria
 SECTION X (Jod): Life and Works of Jesus in Greece
 SECTION XI (Caph): Life and Works of Jesus in Egypt
 SECTION XII (Lamed): The Council of the Seven Sages of the World
 SECTION XIII (Mem): The Ministry of John, the Harbinger
 SECTION XIV (Nun): The Christine Ministry of Jesus—Introductory Epoch
 SECTION XV (Samech): The First Annual Epoch of the Christine Ministry of Jesus
 SECTION XVI (Ain): The Second Annual Epoch of the Christine Ministry of Jesus
 SECTION XVII (Pe): The Third Annual Epoch of the Christine Ministry of Jesus
 SECTION XVIII (Tzaddi): The Arrest and Betrayal of Jesus
 SECTION XIX (Koph): The Trial and Execution of Jesus
 SECTION XX (Resh): The Resurrection of Jesus
 SECTION XXI (Schin): Materialization of the Spiritual Body of Jesus
 SECTION XXII (Tau): Establishment of the Christine Church

Major points

The Aquarian Gospel makes the following claims, among others:
 The revelation of The Aquarian Gospel was prophesied 2,000 years ago by Elihu, who conducted a school of the prophets in Zoan, Egypt. He said thus:
"This age will comprehend but little of the works of Purity and Love; but not a word is lost, for in the Book of God's Remembrance a registry is made of every thought and word and deed.
And When The world is ready to receive, lo, God will send a messenger to open up the book and copy from its sacred pages all the messages of Purity and Love. - Aquarian Gospel 7:25-26
There are 18 unknown years of Jesus' life missing in the Bible (ages 12–30). Like Nicolas Notovitch did before in his The Unknown Life Of Jesus Christ: By The Discoverer Of The Manuscript (1887), the Aquarian Gospel documents these 18 years as a time when Jesus travels to the centers of wisdom in western India, Tibet, Persia, Assyria, Greece, and Egypt. In each of these capital cities, he is educated, tested, and teaches the religious leaders. Jesus inevitably proves that he is 'God's chosen one' (the Christ) in these locales and brings back this multi-cultural wisdom and confidence to Galilee and Judea.
 Jesus puts on the role of The Christ, but is not automatically Christ by nature. By making himself, through desire, effort, ability and prayer, a fit vessel, Jesus enabled The Christ to dwell within him. Christ is therefore used as a term for the seemingly perfect human being that Jesus exemplified, a human being that has been "Christened" (anointed) and therefore made holy.
 Jesus came to Earth to show the way back to God via his lifestyle and teachings. He is the example we must model our own lives after, if we seek salvation.
 Reincarnation exists and karma ("You reap what you sow") is the explanation for various injustices. Reincarnation allows people to settle debts they have incurred in past lives.
 Humanity has forgotten God and is currently working its way back to fully remembering God.
 Time is separated into ages. These ages last approximately 2,000 years. We are now nearing the start of the Aquarian Age.
 All souls will eventually mature and evolve towards the perfect, like Jesus the Christ.
 No soul is ever abandoned by God.
 The trinity is strength, love and wisdom.

Difficulties
In his 1931 book, Strange New Gospels, the biblical scholar Edgar J. Goodspeed noted:
"Augustus Caesar reigned and Herod Antipas was ruler in Jerusalem."  This opening sentence of the new gospel does not encourage any very high hopes as to its historical value.  It is generally accepted that Antipas never rules in Jerusalem but in Galilee. Of course Dowling means Herod the Great."
 Also, that Dowling has borrowed a number of details from the apocryphal Gospel of James, a work that may not be older than the fifth century, such as details about the childhood of Mary and her marriage to Joseph, the birth of Jesus in a cave, and the account of the death of Zacharias which differs from the account given by Origen and other early Fathers.
 Goodspeed notes that the many ancient religions and philosophies taught, in many different countries, to young Jesus in the book seem "colored by Christian Science."

Eric Pement has pointed out difficulties in Dowling's text: 
 The book depicts Jesus as visiting the cities of Lahore, India (pre-Partition in India, now in Pakistan), Shri Jagannath in the temple at Puri in Odisha, India, and Persepolis in Persia.  Only the temple at Puri existed at that period; Lahore did not exist during the period in question, and Persepolis had already been destroyed by Alexander the Great. The book asserts Jesus had remained in the Jagannātha Temple of Puri for four years, preaching among the downtrodden and low caste people.
 Dowling and Edgar Cayce both claimed to have produced an account of the life of Jesus through the transcription of the akashic records, but there are significant differences between their accounts.
 Dowling claimed that Jesus knew Meng-tse of Lhasa, Tibet but Meng-tse lived 300 years before Jesus' time.

Supporters of Dowling argue that within theosophical thought, figures such as Meng-Tse, Matheno, Miriam, Moses, Elijah and Vidyapati exist in an ascended state.  As such, they communicated with Jesus after they had passed on from earthly existence.

Aquarian church

The Aquarian Christine Church Universal, Inc. (ACCU) is a denomination based on the Aquarian Gospel. Members are commonly called Aquarians, but the proper term would be Aquarian Christines. The name Christine is used in the Aquarian Gospel instead of Christian, emphasizing that the church is the Bride of Christ. The church was incorporated in 2006, but had existed for numerous years previous to incorporation. There are no paid professional clergy.

The teachings of the Aquarian Church are based primarily on the Aquarian Gospel, but also on other writings by Levi Dowling, and share many teachings with the I Am Activity (I Am Movement) and Ascended Master Teachings. Some of the teachings include a Triune God composed of God the Father, Christ the Son and the Mother Holy Spirit, release from the cycle of rebirth through the Ascension Process, the equality of the races and sexes and the transformation (transmuting) of the individual and the world through the study and practice of the teachings.

The Moorish Science Temple of America, a religion predominantly adhered to by African-Americans, founded five years after the publication of the Aquarian Gospel, takes much of its "Holy Koran" from the Aquarian Gospel.

See also
 Jesuism
 List of Gospels

References

Text sources
 
 The Aquarian Gospel of Jesus the Christ. (A digital transcription of a portion of the original 1911 edition, with links to the page scan images, refer to the transcription notes)
 The Aquarian Gospel of Jesus the Christ (1911) at the Internet Archive.
 The Aquarian Gospel of Jesus the Christ (e-text) at the Internet Sacred Text Archive.

Further reading

 
 
 Edgar J. Goodspeed, Strange New Gospels (1931), revised as Modern Apocrypha (1956), with a chapter on the Aquarian Gospel

External links
  Online text of the 1911 edition.
 Introducing the Aquarian Gospel
 

1908 non-fiction books
Books about Jesus
Gospels
Modern pseudepigrapha
New Age books